Khagrachhari Cantonment is a cantonment located in Khagrachhari, Bangladesh. 203rd Infantry Brigade of Bangladesh Army inhabit here. It is under the jurisdiction of 24th infantry division.

It is one of five cantonments in Chittagong Hill Tracts area.

Educational institutions 
 Khagrachhari Cantonment Public School & College
 MDS( Hospital)
Lakers Public School & College

See also 
 Alikadam Cantonment
 Bandarban Cantonment

References

Cantonments of Bangladesh